Gentleman Thief (Spanish:Un ladrón de guante blanco) is a 1946 Spanish comedy film directed by Ricardo Gascón and starring Luis Prendes, Silvia Morgan and Alberto Ribeiro.  

The film's sets were designed by Alfonso de Lucas.

Cast
   Luis Prendes as Jaime Borrell  
 Silvia Morgan as Carmen Rico  
 Alberto Ribeiro as Guante Blanco  
 José Jaspe as Star  
 Óscar de Lemos as Parabellum  
 Gema del Río as Elena  
 Mary Santpere as Ernestina  
 José María Oviés as Miguel Rico  
 Modesto Cid

References

Bibliography
 de España, Rafael. Directory of Spanish and Portuguese film-makers and films. Greenwood Press, 1994.

External links 

1946 films
1946 comedy films
Spanish comedy films
1940s Spanish-language films
Films directed by Ricardo Gascón
Spanish black-and-white films
1940s Spanish films